Direct Ishq is a 2016 Indian action romantic comedy film, set in the city of Banaras. The film features Rajneesh Duggal, Nidhi Subbaiah and Arjun Bijlani in the lead roles. It was released on 19 February 2016.

Cast
 Rajneesh Duggal as Vicky Shukla
 Nidhi Subbaiah as Dolly Pandey
 Arjun Bijlani as Kabir Bajpai
 Rajesh Shringapure as Rawde Bhau
 Arun Behl as Vicky's sidekick
 Hemant Pandey
 Rajkumar Kanojia as Vicky's sidekick
 Padam Singh as Kabir's partner
 Manish Nadan Prasad as Chidiyan

Production

Soundtrack
The music was composed by  Tanishk Bagchi, Vivek Kar, Raeth (Band), Sabir Khan and released by Zee Music Company.

References

External links
 

2010s Hindi-language films
Films scored by Vivek Kar
2016 films
Films scored by Tanishk Bagchi
2016 masala films
Films shot in Nepal